Mountain Home Air Force Base  is a United States Air Force (USAF) installation in the western United States. The base is also used by the Republic of Singapore Air Force (RSAF), which has a detachment of F-15SG combat aircraft on long term assignment to the base and a squadron composing of RSAF and USAF personnel.

The host unit at Mountain Home since 1972 has been the 366th Fighter Wing (366 FW) of Air Combat Command (ACC), nicknamed the "Gunfighters."  The base's primary mission is to provide combat airpower and combat support capabilities to respond to and sustain worldwide contingency operations.

Constructed in the early 1940s during World War II as a training base for bombers, after the war it briefly had transports, then was a bomber and missile base. It became a fighter base  in 1966.

Part of the base is a census-designated place (CDP); the population was 3,238 at the 2010 census.

History
Crews started building the base in November 1942 and the new field officially opened on 7 August 1943. Shortly thereafter, airmen at the field began training U.S. Army Air Forces crews for World War II. The 396th Bombardment Group (Heavy) was the first unit assigned and its planned mission was to train crews for the B-17 Flying Fortress. However, before the first B-17s arrived, plans for the field changed and the 396th was transferred to Moses Lake AAF, Washington.

Instead of training B-17 crews, Mountain Home airmen began training crews for the B-24 Liberator. The first group to do so was the 470th Bombardment Group (Heavy), which trained at Mountain Home from May 1943 until January 1944, when the unit moved to Tonopah AAF Nevada. The 490th Bombardment Group (Heavy) replaced the 470th and trained B-24 crews until it deployed to RAF Eye England in April 1944. The 494th Bombardment Group then replaced the 490th, once more training Liberator crews.

The base was placed in inactive status in October 1945.

Postwar era
The base remained inactive for over three years, until December 1948, when the newly independent U.S. Air Force reopened the base. The 4205th Air Base Group, was activated on 12 December to prepare the newly re-designated Mountain Home Air Force Base for operational use.

Three wings of the Air Resupply and Communications Service used the base in the early 1950s.

In 1953, the base was transferred to Strategic Air Command (SAC), which assigned its 9th Bombardment Wing to Mountain Home. The 9th relocated to Mountain Home AFB in May 1953, and began flying B-29 bombers and KB-29H refueling aircraft. The 9th began converting to the new B-47 Stratojet bomber and the KC-97 tanker in September 1954, keeping alert bombers ready for war at a moments notice and continuing its mission as a deterrent force throughout the Cold War years of the 1950s and early 1960s.

In 1959, construction of three SM-68 Titan missile sites began in the local area, and missiles arrived in April 1962. The 569th Strategic Missile Squadron controlled these sites and was assigned to the 9th Bombardment Wing in August 1962. To prepare for the addition of missiles to its bomber forces, it was redesignated the 9th Strategic Aerospace Wing in April 1962.

A few years later, SAC's mission at Mountain Home began to wind down, and in November 1964, the U.S. Air Force announced that the missile sites would close by mid-1965, part of a major round of base closures announced by Secretary of Defense Robert McNamara. Other closures in the region were also USAF facilities: the Cottonwood radar station in north central Idaho and SAC's Larson AFB, a B-52E Stratofortress (and KC-135A Stratotanker) installation in eastern Washington at Moses Lake.

In late 1965, the USAF also began phasing out the aging B-47 and announced plans to bring the 67th Tactical Reconnaissance Wing to Mountain Home, transferring the base from SAC to the Tactical Air Command (TAC) in early 1966.

366th Fighter Wing

The 366th Fighter Wing (in various designations) has been the host unit at Mountain Home for over 50 years, following its return from the Vietnam War in late 1972.

Before the 366th Tactical Fighter Wing's arrival at Mountain Home, the 389th, 390th, and 391st Tactical Fighter Squadrons had returned from South Vietnam, joined the 347th, and began converting to F-111A Aardvark aircraft. For the first time since it left for Vietnam, the wing once again had its three original flying units.

During 1969, a tenant unit began operating at the south end of the base, using part of the original SAC alert area, and about half of the Mole Hole alert facility, sharing the other half with an NCO leadership school from the main base. Det. 1, 320 BW carried out an alert mission with two B-52 bombers and two KC-135 tankers. The unit disbanded in the spring of 1975 and returned to Mather AFB.

Operations continued unchanged for several years. The wing tested its readiness in August 1976 when a border incident in Korea prompted the U.S. to augment its military contingent in South Korea as a show of force. The 366th deployed a squadron of 20 F-111 fighters, which reached South Korea only 31 hours after receiving launch notification. Tensions eased shortly afterward and the detachment returned home. 

In early 1991, the USAF announced that the 366th would become the Air Force's premier "air intervention" composite wing. The wing would grow with the addition of a squadron of EF-111A Raven electronic warfare aircraft and a squadron of B-1B Lancer bombers to become a dynamic, five squadron wing with the ability to deploy rapidly and deliver integrated combat airpower.

The air intervention composite wing's rapid transition from concept to reality began in October 1991 when the USAF redesignated the wing as the 366th Wing. The wing's newly reactivated "fighter squadrons" became part of the composite wing in March 1992. The 389th Fighter Squadron began flying the dual-role F-16C Fighting Falcon, while the 391st Fighter Squadron was equipped with the new F-15E Strike Eagle. These two squadrons provide the Gunfighters round-the-clock precision strike capability.

Following the terrorist attacks on 11 September 2001, the resultant initiation of Operation Enduring Freedom, the 366th Wing once again got the call. While the 34th Bomb Squadron deployed to Diego Garcia as the B-1 component of the 28th Air Expeditionary Wing, the wing sent a Base Operations Support package to Al Udeid Air Base, Qatar, to transform the bare base into a fully functional airfield for large-scale combat operations. In October 2001, the 391st Fighter Squadron deployed to Al Jaber Air Base, Kuwait, while the 389th Fighter Squadron went to Al Udeid in November.

Following the wing's return from Southwest Asia, the USAF began consolidating its B-1 Lancer and KC-135 Stratotanker forces. This led to the reallocation of the wing's bombers and tankers. The 22 ARS' aircraft began transferring to McConnell AFB, Kansas, in May 2002 and the squadron inactivated the following August. The 34 BS' B-1Bs began moving to Ellsworth AFB, South Dakota, in June and the squadron officially moved in September. Following the departure of these assets, the USAF re-designated the 366th as a Fighter Wing. With these changes, the wing's 10-year mission as the Air Force's only standing air expeditionary wing came to an end. A continued reconstruction of the 366 Fighter Wing was official with the 2005 base realignment, coinciding with the large scale integration of the 150+ F-22 Raptors. After the F-16 departure, Mountain Home AFB was chosen to become an F-15E installation because of its ideal training terrain range that is suited for air-to-ground, and air-to-air training missions.

Thunderbirds crash

The base was the site of a Thunderbirds crash on 14 September 2003 in which no one was killed. Captain Chris Stricklin, flying Thunderbird 6 (opposing solo, serial #87-0327), attempted a "Split S" maneuver (which he had performed over 200 times) immediately after takeoff based on an incorrect mean-sea-level elevation.  Similar in desert appearance, Mountain Home AFB is  higher than the Thunderbirds' home at Nellis AFB near Las Vegas, Nevada.

He guided the F-16C aircraft down runway 30, away from the spectators and ejected less than one second before impact. His parachute deployed when he was just above the ground and Stricklin survived with only minor injuries. No one on the ground was injured, but the $20 million aircraft was destroyed.

Official procedure for demonstration "Split-S" maneuvers was changed, and the USAF now requires Thunderbird pilots and airshow ground controllers to both work in above mean-sea-level (AMSL) altitudes, as opposed to ground control working in AGL and pilots in AMSL, which led to two sets of numbers that had to be reconciled by the pilot. Thunderbird pilots now also climb an extra  before performing the Split S maneuver.

Previous names
 Army Air Base, Mountain Home, Nov 1942
 Mountain Home Army Air Field, 2 Dec 1943.
 Mountain Home Air Force Base, 13 Jan 1948 – present

Major commands to which assigned
 Second Air Force, 29 August 1942
 Fourth Air Force, 15 February 1945
 Continental Air Forces, 16 April 1945
 Temporary inactive status, 5 Oct 1945.
 Subbase of Gowen Army Airfield (Boise), Idaho, 9 Oct 1945
 Subbase of Walla Walla Army Airfield, Washington, 31 Dec 1945 – 30 September 1946
 Strategic Air Command, 21 March 1946
 Activated on 1 December 1948
 Inactivated on 25 April 1950
 Subbase of Fairfield-Suisun (later, Travis) AFB, California, c. 1 Apr 1950 – 24 Jan 1951
 Military Air Transport Service, 24 January 1951
 Activated on 1 Feb 1951
 Strategic Air Command, 1 May 1953
 Tactical Air Command, 1 January 1966
 Air Combat Command, 1 June 1992 – present

Major units assigned

 396th Bombardment Group (Heavy), 16 February–10 April 1943
 470th Bombardment Group (Heavy), 1 May 1943 – 1 January 1944
 467th Bombardment Group (Heavy), 8 September–17 October 1943
 490th Bombardment Group, Heavy, 4 December 1943 – 20 April 1944
 494th Bombardment Group (Heavy), 15 April–1 June 1944
 4205th Air Base Group, 12 December 1948 – 16 July 1949
 5th Reconnaissance Group, Very Long Range, Photo, 29 May-16 July 1949
 5th Strategic Reconnaissance Wing, 16 July–11 November 1949
 1300th Air Base Wing, 1 November 1951 – 30 April 1953
 580th Air Resupply and Communications Wing, 16 April 1951 – 17 September 1952
 581st Air Resupply and Communications Wing, 23 July 1951 – 26 June 1952

 582nd Air Resupply and Communications Wing, 24 September 1952 – 1 May 1953
 9th Bombardment Wing, Medium (later 9th Strategic Aerospace Wing), 1 May 1953 – 25 June 1966
 813th Air Division, 1 July 1959 – 1 July 1964
 569th Strategic Missile Squadron, June 1961 – March 1965
 67th Tactical Reconnaissance Wing, 1 January 1966 – 15 July 1971
 347th Tactical Fighter Wing, 15 May 1971 – 31 October 1972
 366th Tactical Fighter Wing, 31 October 1972 – 1 October 1991
 Redesignated 366th Wing, 1 October 1991 – 27 September 2002
 Redesignated 366th Fighter Wing, 27 September 2002 – present

Intercontinental ballistic missile facilities

The 569th Strategic Missile Squadron Operated three HGM-25A Titan I ICBM sites: (1 Jun 1961 – 25 Jun 1965). The first missiles arrived in April 1962.

Role and operations
Mountain Home AFB is the home of the 366th Fighter Wing (366 FW), which reports to Air Combat Command (ACC). The mission of the 366 FW is to prepare Airmen and their families, professionally and personally, for expeditionary operations and foster an environment that promotes integration of all facets of wing operations.

The wing comprises three operational fighter squadrons:

 366th Operations Group (Tail code: "MO")

389th Fighter Squadron (F-15E Strike Eagle)
391st Fighter Squadron (F-15E Strike Eagle)
428th Fighter Squadron (F-15SG) Republic of Singapore Air Force

In addition, the 726th Air Control Squadron gives an air picture to the aircraft as they train. An active Idaho Air National Guard unit, the 266th Range Squadron, controls and maintains emitter sites within the  operational training range in southwestern Idaho.

Based units
Flying and notable non-flying units based at Mountain Home AFB.

Units marked GSU are Geographically Separate Units, which although based at Mountain Home, are subordinate to a parent unit based at another location.

United States Air Force 

Air Combat Command (ACC)

 Fifteenth Air Force
 366th Fighter Wing
 366th Comptroller Squadron
 366th Operations Group
 366th Operation Support Squadron
 389th Fighter Squadron – F-15E Strike Eagle
 391st Fighter Squadron – F-15E Strike Eagle
 428th Fighter Squadron – F-15SG Strike Eagle
 366th Maintenance Group
 366th Component Maintenance Squadron
 366th Equipment Maintenance Squadron 
 366th Medical Group
 366th Aerospace Medicine Squadron
 366th Medical Operations Squadron
 366th Medical Support Squadron
 366th Mission Support Group
 366th Civil Engineer Squadron
 366th Communications Squadron
 366th Contracting Squadron  
 366th Force Support Squadron
 366th Logistics Readiness Squadron
 366th Security Forces Squadron
 552nd Air Control Wing
 552nd Air Control Group
 726th Air Control Squadron (GSU)

Air National Guard (ANG)

 Idaho Air National Guard
 124th Fighter Wing
 266th Range Squadron (GSU)

Geography

It is connected to the city of Mountain Home by State Highway 67.

Demographics

As of the census of 2000, there were 8,894 people, 1,476 households, and 1,452 families residing in the CDP. The racial makeup of the CDP was 83.2% White, 6.9% Black or African American, 0.8% Native American, 2.5% Asian, 0.2% Pacific Islander, 2.7% from other races, and 3.7% from two or more races. Hispanic or Latino of any race were 6.5% of the population.

There were 1,476 households, out of which 76.4% had children under the age of 18 living with them, 91.9% were married couples living together, 4.4% had a female householder with no husband present, and 1.6% were non-families. 1.4% of all households were made up of individuals, and none had someone living alone who was 65 years of age or older.  The average household size was 3.40 and the average family size was 3.43.

In the CDP, the population was spread out, with 24.0% under the age of 18, 24.4% from 18 to 24, 49.7% from 25 to 44, 1.8% from 45 to 64, and 0.1% who were 65 years of age or older.  The median age was 25 years. For every 100 females, there were 180.8 males.  For every 100 females age 18 and over, there were 219.5 males.

The median income for a household in the CDP was $31,634, and the median income for a family was $31,377. Males had a median income of $24,865 versus $20,664 for females. The per capita income for the CDP was $17,671.  About 6.5% of families and 7.4% of the population were below the poverty line, including 9.1% of those under age 18 and none of those age 65 or over.

See also

 Idaho World War II Army Airfields
 Fighter Wing: A Guided Tour of an Air Force Combat Wing – by Tom Clancy

References

Further reading

 Maurer, Maurer. Air Force Combat Units of World War II. Washington, DC: U.S. Government Printing Office 1961 (republished 1983, Office of Air Force History).
 Ravenstein, Charles A. Air Force Combat Wings Lineage and Honors Histories 1947–1977. Maxwell Air Force Base, Alabama: Office of Air Force History 1984. .
 Mueller, Robert, Air Force Bases Volume I, Active Air Force Bases Within the United States of America on 17 September 1982, Office of Air Force History, 1989
 USAAS-USAAC-USAAF-USAF Aircraft Serial Numbers—1908 to present

External links

Mountain Home AFB history from Strategic-Air-Command.com
Mountain Home AFB at GlobalSecurity.org

Census-designated places in Elmore County, Idaho
Buildings and structures in Elmore County, Idaho
Historic American Engineering Record in Idaho
Installations of the United States Air Force in Idaho
Military Superfund sites
Space Shuttle Emergency Landing Sites
Installations of Strategic Air Command
Superfund sites in Idaho